Mihai Nistor (born 5 November 1990) is a Romanian professional boxer. A southpaw, he is best known for stopping Anthony Joshua at the 39th European Amateur Boxing Championships in 2011. As an amateur, Nistor competed in the men's super heavyweight event at the 2016 Summer Olympics, where he was eliminated in the round of 16 by the Jordanian Hussein Ishaish. Nistor competed in the semi-professional World Series of Boxing 2013 to 2018, representing Astana Arlans, Italia Thunder, and Fighting Roosters. He had 157 fights as an amateur and finished with a record of 138-19. In 2019 Nistor started his professional career.

Amateur career

International highlights

2009 – Arena Cup (Pula, Croatia) 5th place – 91KG
 1/4: Lost to Marko Calic (Croatia) RSCI 2
 2010 – Sportaccord World Combat Games (Beijing, China) 2nd place – +91KG
 1/4: Defeated Andrew Jones (Wales) 7:1
 1/2: Defeated Tomasz Duszak (Poland) 9:1
 Finals: Lost to Zhang Zhilei (China) AB 3
 2011 – Bocskai Memorial Tournament (Debrecen, Hungary) 2nd place – +91KG
 1/4: Defeated Hrvoje Kisicek (Croatia) RSC 1
 1/2: Defeated Bence Bouquet (Hungary) AB 3
 Finals: Lost to Erislandy Savón (Cuba) AB 2
 2011 – Zlatko Hrbic Memorial Tournament (Zagreb, Croatia) 3rd place – +91KG
 1/4: Defeated Stjepan Radić (Croatia) 9:4
 1/2: Lost to Rok Urbanc (Slovenia) 7+:7
 2011 – Hakija Turajlic Memorial Tournament (Sarajevo, Bosnia and Herzegovina) 2nd place – +91KG
 Finals: Lost to Primislav Dimovski (Macedonia) DQ 2
 2011 – EUBC European Continental Championships (Ankara, Turkey) 3rd place – +91KG
 1/16: Defeated Muhammet Guner (Turkey) RSCI 1
 1/8: Defeated Petar Belberov (Bulgaria) RSCI 2
 1/4: Defeated Anthony Joshua (United Kingdom) RSCH 3
 1/2: Lost to Roberto Cammarelle (Italy) AB 2
2011 – AIBA World Championships (Baku, Azerbaijan) participant – +91KG
 1/16: Defeated Bence Bouquet (Hungary) KO 1
 1/8: Lost to Filip Hrgović (Croatia) 22:10

 2012 – Chemistry Cup (Halle, Germany) 3rd place – +91KG
 1/4: Defeated Sardorbek Abdullayev (Uzbekistan) RSC 3
 1/2: Lost to Sergey Kuzmin (Russia) 18:11
2012 – AIBA European Olympic Qualification Tournament (Trabzon, Turkey) 6th place – +91KG
 1/8: Defeated Otto Wallin (Sweden) KO 2
 1/4: Lost to Tony Yoka (France) 13:9
 2013 – Golden Belt Tournament (Constanta, Romania) 1st place – +91KG
 1/2: Defeated Issa Ahmed Madian Kassem (Egypt) 3:0
 Finals: Defeated Jose Angel Larduet (Cuba) 3:0
 2013 – Independence Cup (Drochia, Moldova) 1st place – +91KG
 Finals: Defeated Erik Pfeifer (Germany) PTS
2013 – EUBC European Continental Championships (Minsk, Belarus) 5th place – +91KG
 1/8: Defeated Aleksei Zavatin (Moldova) TKO 2
 1/4: Lost to Magomedrasul Medzhidov (Azerbaijan) DQ 3
2013 – AIBA World Championships (Almaty, Kazakhstan) 11th place – +91KG
 1/8: Defeated Milutin Stanković (Serbia) 2:1
 2015 – EUBC European Confederation Boxing Championships (Samokov, Bulgaria) 3rd place – +91KG
 1/8: Defeated Aleksei Zavatin (Moldova) TKO 2
 1/4: Defeated Igor Shevadzutskiy (Ukraine) 3:0
 1/2: Lost to Filip Hrgović (Croatia) 2:1

World Series of Boxing
2012, Season 2012/2013 4th Round – +91KG
 Lost to Tony Yoka (France) 2:1
2013, Season 2012/2013 9th Round – +91KG
 Defeated Clemente Russo (Italy) 2:1
2013, Season 2012/2013 Finals – +91KG
 Lost to Oleksandr Usyk (Ukraine) 3:0
2013, Season 2013/2014 1st Round – +91KG
 Defeated Facundo Cesar Ghiglione (Argentina) 3:0
2014, Season 2013/2014 5th Round – +91KG
 Defeated Paul Koon (United States) 3:0
2014, Season 2013/2014 9th Round – +91KG
 Defeated Yegor Plevako (Ukraine) 3:0
2014, Season 2013/2014 Quarter-finals 2nd Leg – +91KG
 Lost to Arslanbek Mahmudov (Azerbaijan) 3:0

AIBA Pro Boxing
2014, Pre-Ranking Round 1 (Baku, Azerbaijan) – +91KG
 Defeated Ali Kiyidin (Germany) 3:0
2014, Pre-Ranking Round 2 (Baku, Azerbaijan) – +91KG
 Lost to Mohamed Arjaoui (Marocco) 3:0
2014, Ranking Match (Baku, Azerbaijan) – +91KG
 Lost to Erik Pfeifer (Germany) 3:0
2015, Title Round (Baku, Azerbaijan) – +91KG
 Defeated Tony Yoka (France) WO
2015, Cycle I Round 1 (Marrakech, Marocco) – +91KG
 Defeated Magomed Omarov (Russia) 2:1
2015, Cycle I Round 2 (Marrakech, Marocco) – +91KG
 Defeated Mohamed Arjaoui (Marocco) 2:1

National highlights
 Romania
2009 National Cup 7th place – 91KG
 1/8: Defeated Alin Manea RSC 2
 1/4: Lost to Adrian Zabava WO
 2009 National Championships 3rd place – 91KG
 1/4: Defeated Adrian Ciobanu 5:1
 1/2: Lost to Petrisor Gananau 14:4
 2010 National Championships 1st place – +91KG
 1/2: Defeated Artur David AB 1
 Finals: Defeated Petrisor Gananau AB 3
 2012 National Cup 1st place – +91KG
 Finals: Defeated Petrisor Gananau PTS
 2012 National Championships 1st place – +91KG
 1/2: Defeated Adrian Motorga WO
 Finals: Defeated Adrian Marc WO
 2013 National Championships 1st place – +91KG
 1/4: Defeated Ionel Oșvat TKO
 1/2: Defeated Ionuț Patriche WO
 Finals: Defeated Marian Preda KO
 2014 National Championships 1st place – +91KG
 Finals: Defeated Tiberiu Porcoi TKO
 2015 National Cup 1st place – +91KG
 1/4: Defeated Andrei Crivat DQ 2
 1/2: Defeated Ionel Osvat TKO 2
 Finals: Defeated Tiberiu Porcoi TKO 1
 2016 National Championships 1st place – +91KG
 Finals: Defeated Lucian Atănăsoaie WO
 2017 National Championships 1st place – +91KG
 1/2: Defeated Mădălin Nicolae
 Finals: Defeated Adrian Poputea
 2018 National Championships 1st place – +91KG
 Finals: Defeated Daniel Berciu AB 2

 Moldova
 2010 Prime Ministry Team Tournament (Briceni, Moldova) 2nd place – +91KG
 1/2: Defeated Aleksei Zavatin RSC 3
 Finals: Lost to Mihail Muntean 7:1

Professional boxing record

References

External links
 
 
 
 

1990 births
Living people
Romanian male boxers
Olympic boxers of Romania
Boxers at the 2016 Summer Olympics
Place of birth missing (living people)
European Games competitors for Romania
Boxers at the 2019 European Games
Super-heavyweight boxers